USS Eider (AM-17) was a  of the United States Navy.

Laid down on 25 September 1917 by the Pusey and Jones Company of Wilmington, Delaware, Eider was launched on 26 May 1918, and commissioned as USS Eider, (Minesweeper No.17) on 23 January 1919.

Post-World War I Operations 
Eider sailed out of Philadelphia, Pennsylvania, for minesweeping operations in the Delaware River approaches until 8 March 1919, then put into Norfolk, Virginia, to prepare for distant service. On 3 April 1919 she departed for Scotland and alternately based on Kirkwall and Invergordon, Orkney Islands, swept the vast North Sea minefield. Eider was on hand to assist in the rescue of  when Pelican was gravely damaged by an exploding mine on 9 July 1919. Returning home in October she called at Brest, Lisbon, the Azores and Bermuda.

Arriving at Charleston Navy Yard on 1 December 1919 Eider was placed in reduced commission for repairs. Placed in full commission again for passage to Mare Island, California, Eider sailed from Norfolk, Virginia, 10 July 1920 and arrived on 28 August to report to Commander, Train, Base Force. On 10 September she was again placed in reduced commission with a partial complement.

Pacific Theatre operations 
In 1921 Eider's homeport was changed to Pearl Harbor, where she arrived on 18 June. She was decommissioned on 18 April 1922, laid up until 1937, and finally sent back to Mare Island, California, still in decommissioned status. In 1940 she was converted for duty as a gate tender and reclassified YNG-20 on 7 October 1940. Placed in service in 1941, based on the Naval Net Depot, Tiburon, she operated with net tenders in San Francisco Bay throughout World War II.

Fate 
Eider was transferred to the Maritime Commission for disposal on 1 July 1947.

References

External links 
 

Lapwing-class minesweepers
World War II auxiliary ships of the United States
1918 ships
Ships built by Pusey and Jones